The discography of Marie-Mai, a Canadian singer, contains six studio albums, one extended play, nine singles and a video album.

Albums

Studio albums

Extended plays

Singles

As featured artist

Video albums

Music videos

Notes

References

Discographies of Canadian artists